The Vigil is an album recorded by Chick Corea and released sixth of August 2013. In the Billboard Jazz albums charts the album peaked at number 4. The album won the Latin Grammy Award for Best Latin Jazz Album at the 15th Annual Latin Grammy Awards.

Track listing

Personnel
 Chick Corea – Yamaha CFIIIS concert grand piano, synthesizers (Yamaha Motif XF8 & Minimoog Voyager)
 Tim Garland – bass clarinet, flute, soprano saxophone, tenor saxophone
 Charles Altura – acoustic guitar, electric guitar
 Hadrien Feraud – bass
 Marcus Gilmore – drums

Additional musicians
 Pernell Saturnino – percussion (tracks 1–3)
 Gayle Moran Corea – vocals (track 5)
 Stanley Clarke – bass  (track 6)
 Ravi Coltrane – saxophone (track 6)

 Other credits
 Marc Bessant – graphic design
 Bob Cetti – assistant engineer
 C. Taylor Crothers – photography
 Bernie Grundman – mastering
 Bernie Kirsh – engineer, mixing
 Dan Muse – liner note coordination
 Bill Rooney – management
 Robert Schoeller – cover art
 Buck Snow – mixing

Critical reception

John Kelman of All About Jazz comments, "The Vigil is certainly Corea's best electric album in decades,..., he's not made a single recording of new material anything like The Vigil in decades".

Thom Jurek from AllMusic wrote, "These seven tunes (five are over ten minutes) reflect some of Corea's richest writing and arranging in years." He praises the band as exciting "as much for its potential as for the multifaceted talent the group members put on display here".

John Fordham of the Guardian wrote, "Pianist Chick Corea, now 71, sounds on scintillating form here (...). The title apparently represents the vigil of jazz's elder statespersons in cherishing their pasts – but this unexpectedly full-on set is all about celebrating and reinventing, not polishing silverware."

Steve Greenlee from JazzTimes stated, "This is, in fact, the most exciting music Corea has released in many years, and it features the most virile new writing that Corea has offered in a quarter-century (or more)."

Hernan Campbell from Sputnikmusic summarized his review, "He's like a mad scientist at work in this album, combining the elements that made his previous albums so enthralling (...) and breathes life to a new embodiment of masterful ingenuity." The album won the Latin Grammy Award for Best Latin Jazz Album at the 15th Annual Latin Grammy Awards.

Chart performance

References

External links
 Chick Corea - The Vigil (2013) album review by Thom Jurek, credits & releases at AllMusic
 Chick Corea - The Vigil (2013) album releases & credits at Discogs
 Chick Corea - The Vigil (2013) album to be listened as stream on Spotify

Chick Corea albums
Jazz fusion albums by American artists
2013 albums
Concord Records albums
Latin Grammy Award for Best Latin Jazz Album